Deokcheon Station is a station on the Busan Metro Line 2 and Line 3 located in Deokcheon-dong, Buk District, Busan. The subname in parentheses is Busan Institute of Science and Technology.

Gallery

See also 
 Busan Institute of Science and Technology

References 
 Cyber station information, Line 2 from Busan Transportation Corporation 
 Cyber station information, Line 3 from Busan Transportation Corporation 

Railway stations in South Korea opened in 1999
Railway stations opened in 2005
Busan Metro stations
Buk District, Busan